St Ives by-election may refer to:

 1838 St Ives by-election
 1846 St Ives by-election
 1874 St Ives by-election
 1875 St Ives by-election
 1881 St Ives by-election
 1887 St Ives by-election
 1928 St Ives by-election
 1937 St Ives by-election